Prune dwarf virus (PDV) is a plant pathogenic virus of the family Bromoviridae. It causes dwarfism of leaves on certain prune and plum plants. It will also cause yellows in sour cherry, especially when present with prunus necrotic ringspot virus. There are no known transmission vectors, though the pollen of infected cherry trees has been found to infect other cherry trees a small percent of the time.

References

External links
 ICTVdB - The Universal Virus Database: Prune dwarf virus
 Family Groups - The Baltimore Method

Bromoviridae
Viral plant pathogens and diseases